Places called Clandon in Surrey, England:

 East Clandon
 West Clandon
 Clandon Park, 18th century Palladian mansion in West Clandon
 Clandon railway station